Bags' Opus is an album by vibraphonist Milt Jackson featuring performances recorded in 1958 and released on the United Artists label.

Reception
The AllMusic review by Scott Yanow awarded the album 4½ stars, calling it "A successful outing by some of the greats."

Track listing
All compositions by Milt Jackson except as indicated
 "Ill Wind" (Harold Arlen, Ted Koehler) - 4:28 
 "Blues for Diahann" - 7:25 
 "Afternoon in Paris" (John Lewis) - 6:02 
 "I Remember Clifford" (Benny Golson) - 5:55 
 "Thinking of You" (Bert Kalmar, Harry Ruby) - 4:23 
 "Whisper Not" (Golson) - 6:16 
Recorded at Nola's Penthouse Sound Studios in New York City on December 28 & 29, 1958

Personnel
Milt Jackson – vibes
Art Farmer - trumpet 
Benny Golson - tenor saxophone
Tommy Flanagan - piano
Paul Chambers - bass
Connie Kay - drums

References 

United Artists Records albums
Milt Jackson albums
1959 albums